Jeanne-Marie Chavoin (29 August 1786 – 30 June 1858) and Jean-Claude Colin together founded the Marist Sisters, a Catholic religious institute of women.

Jeanne-Marie was born in the village of Coutouvre, France. She met Fr Pierre Colin when he was parish priest at Coutouvre.  She later joined Jean Claude Colin at Cerdon where they were both serving as priests. Together  they worked on the beginning of the Marist Sisters. The Marist Organization was purely based on women and their relationship to God. The Marist legacy has successfully opened many schools across the globe.

Life 
Jeanne-Marie Chavoin was born in the small village of Coutouvre in France on the 29th of August 1786. Chavoin was considered sinful because she was conceived by her 19 and 20 year old parents 6 months before their marriage. She had two sisters Marie and Claudine-marie. Sadly Marie died at the age of one.

Jeanne-Marie had very little education and was often known for having bad spelling. She was known however for having a very good judgement and a kind nature. She worked at her father's tailor shop throughout the French revolution and the business stayed stable as her friendly and outgoing nature made no enemies.

After being inspired by a sermon by an influential preacher Chavoin started praying in her teenage years and joined a prayer group called the Association of Divine love. Through this group she was asked to take up religious monastic positions but each time she declined as she wanted to do something religious but less monastic. Eventually though Fr. Jean-Philibert Lefranc God spoke to Chavoin saying “God does not want you to join an existing congregation, but one which has yet to come into existence.”

Circa 1817 Chavoin, Jean-Claude Colin and Marie Jotillon started the Marist movement in Cerdon.

Sister Jeanne-Marie Chavoin died on the 30th of June 1858 in an unknown location mostly to be in the south of France. Her efforts or humble and silent charity only revealed beyond the sisterhood years later.

The Marist movement flourished until 1821 where Chavoin and Colin had a disagreement about whether to keep the movement enclosed or to be missionaries. This broke up the original Marist movement but Chavoin continued the movement that is still alive today.

The Marist movement continued by Chavoin is now a global brother and sisterhood and has set up many schools and churches.

References

 Jessica Leonard, Triumph of Failure: Jeanne Marie Chavoin, Foundress of the Marist Sisters, 1988.
 By a Gracious Choice: The Story of Jeanne Marie Chavoin, Foundress of the Marist Sisters, 2001, 24 pages.
 Myra Niland, Hidden Fruitfulness: The Life and Spirituality of Jeanne-Marie Chavoin, Foundress of the Congregation of Marist Sisters (1786-1858), Columba Press, 2001, 269 pages .
https://www.acertainway.info/origins/consider-the-rock/jeanne-marie-chavoin/
http://maristsisters.org/tag/marist-sisters-in-new-zealand/

1786 births
1858 deaths